Hampton Cove is a master-planned housing subdivision located in Big Cove area of Huntsville, Alabama. Situated in the foothills and valleys of North Alabama's Cumberland Plateau, the  Housing lies in the coves between Monte Sano Mountain and Green Mountain to the west, and Keel Mountain to the east.

Hampton Cove has 2,000 homes in twenty one different areas ranging from patio homes and townhomes to family homes and multimillion-dollar estates.
Hampton Cove is adjacent to the  Hays Nature Preserve and the Big Cove Creek Greenway. Hampton Cove is unincorporated and shares land with Huntsville, Gurley, Owens Cross Roads, and Big Cove. They currently do not have a high school or their own zip code.

The average household income in 2018 is stated to be 145,000.

History
Development of Hampton Cove began in 1992, in a partnership between brothers John and Jimmy Hays and nephew Jeff Enfinger. The partners purchased the acreage just over Monte Sano Mountain from several different landowners including Burritt and Whitaker to develop a golf course and subdivision in what was then open countryside between the city of Huntsville and the rural communities of Big Cove, Gurley and Owens Cross Roads. Additional land was purchased from Robert L. Sublett, a local farmer in the Little Cove area. The addition of three Robert Trent Jones Golf Trail courses encouraged further development in the area. Much of the golf course is on the former Burritt property.

Formerly a rural community, the area was once known as Horse Cove, because local residents hid their horses there to prevent them being seized by the Union Army during the Civil War. The land was originally occupied by the Cherokee and Chickasaw tribes before becoming part of the Mississippi Territory in 1806. According to A History of Madison County and Incidentally of North Alabama, 1732–1840 by Judge Thomas Jones Taylor, "The lands of old Madison being the first offered for sale were eagerly sought for and rapidly taken up and occupied by a class of settlers who were in intellect, enterprise and energy, the prize of any continent." Settlers were drawn to the area for its fertile soil and the natural beauty of the mountains and adjacent Flint River.

All services are provided by Huntsville. The community shares a zip code (35763) with Owens Cross Roads, a nearby town. Big Cove, an unincorporated community, is near Hampton Cove.

Neighborhoods and schools
Hampton Cove consists of 20 neighborhoods:

 Arbor Woods
 Cobblestone Cove
 Cumberland Cove
 Deford Mill
 Deford Mill Estates
 Eastern Shore
 Flint Mill
 Glen Eagles 
 Grande Highlands
 Grande Highlands Estates
 Hampton Cove Estates
 Lake Pointe
 Mallard's Landing
 Providence Island
 Stoneleigh Terrace
 Sussex Quarter
 Tammerack Lakes
 Tammerack Links
 Treyburne
 Twelve Stones

Hampton Cove contains two elementary schools and one middle school. Hampton Cove Elementary was first built in the 1990s in order to accommodate the growing population of the area. Because of the rapid growth of the region, a second elementary school, Goldsmith-Schiffman Elementary School was opened in 2011. Both schools advance to Hampton Cove Middle School, which shares its campus with Hampton Cove Elementary School. All four schools fall within the Huntsville City Schools system.

Recreation and media
Hampton Cove hosts one of ten stops on the Robert Trent Jones Golf Trail.  Hampton Cove's , three-course, 54-hole facility is open year-round and includes a club house with a pro shop, meeting rooms, bar, and restaurant.

Hampton Cove is also home to 28 stocked lakes for fishing, miles of walking and biking trails and horse riding paths, and a  city park with baseball, softball, and soccer fields. The area including Flint River,  Hays Nature Preserve, and Goldsmith Schiffman Wildlife Sanctuary offer additional recreational opportunities.

In addition to the Huntsville radio, television, and print media outlets, Hampton Cove maintains its own magazine, LIFE in Hampton Cove, and a website which features local events.

The Hampton House is located in the Hampton Cove Community, with amenities that include six clay tennis courts with lights for night play, and an Olympic size pool.

Notable people
 Michael Luwoye – actor and singer, known for playing the title role in the musical Hamilton, in its national touring company (2017) and on Broadway (2018)
 Jonathan "Rudy" Ford – cornerback for the Arizona Cardinals (2017–present), starting defensive back for the Auburn Tigers (2013–2017) Johnathan Ford went to New Hope High School

References

External links
The Hampton House
Hampton Cove Community Site

Geography of Huntsville, Alabama
Neighborhoods in Alabama
Populated places established in 1992
Neighborhoods in Huntsville, Alabama